The 1978 National Rowing Championships was the seventh edition of the National Championships, held from 14–16 July 1978 at the National Water Sports Centre in Holme Pierrepont, Nottingham. There was a record entry of 428 crews.

Senior

Medal summary

Lightweight

Medal summary

Junior

Medal summary

Veteran

Medal summary 

Key

References 

British Rowing Championships
British Rowing Championships
British Rowing Championships